Victor Serebriakoff (17 October 1912  – 1 January 2000) was one of the early members of Mensa. Serebriakoff is known for his contributions to lumber technology, writing intelligence quotient (IQ) tests, as well as organising and promoting Mensa.

Family background
Victor Serebriakoff was born in Camberwell, London, the eldest son of Vladimir and Ethel Serebriakoff (née Graham). Eventually, the family had five daughters and two sons. Vladimir's father was Esper Serebriakoff, who married Katherine Seitelman. Esper joined the Russian navy in 1870, but left in 1885 after rising to the rank of lieutenant, having become involved in revolutionary politics, leaving Russia in 1888. Esper's father, Alexander, was a lieutenant colonel in the Russian army.

Accomplishments
After leaving the army in 1947 he worked in the timber industry, becoming known for introducing automatic grading of timber for strength, eventually selling machines world wide. In the 1970s he led a British delegation to a timber metrification conference in the Soviet Union.

Serebriakoff wrote prolifically on the timber trade, Mensa and its history, and educating gifted children. He also wrote puzzle books. Many of his works were translated. He took greatest pride in his book Brain in which he set out a theory of how the brain operates.

Mensa

His first wife, Mary, encouraged Serebriakoff to join Mensa in 1949, when the number of members was only a few hundred. Initially, he wasn't heavily involved. Victor suffered a bereavement when Mary was found to have tongue cancer. She died in July 1952 after just 3 years of marriage and two children.

Win Rouse, a Lady Almoner or hospital social worker (and ex-Bletchley Park staff), had helped Victor and Mary during the illness. By coincidence, she was a member of Mensa, having met Victor at meetings. After Mary died, they eventually became a couple and married in October 1953.

Victor became active in promoting Mensa.  He and Win evaluated I.Q. tests at their home in Blackheath, London, and organised the Mensa annual general meeting from there.  He was also a principal of the lively Blackheath Poetry Society in the 1950s, and a prolific author of light verse. Eventually Mensa could support paid staff, leading to National Mensa organisations starting in many countries.  Victor often publicised Mensa in the worldwide media through the 1960s, '70s, and '80s.

Victor was elected International President of Mensa, an office that he held at his death.

Bibliography

Translated

References

1912 births
2000 deaths
Deaths from prostate cancer
British non-fiction writers
British people of Russian descent
Mensans
British male writers
Male non-fiction writers